"Let Us Now Praise Famous Death Dwarves (or how I slugged it out with Lou Reed and stayed awake)" is an infamous interview with Lou Reed conducted by Lester Bangs and published in Creem magazine in 1975. It is now regarded as a classic document of music journalism. The title is a play on Let Us Now Praise Famous Men, the book by James Agee. The full interview was reprinted in the New Musical Express in November 2013, as a tribute to Lou Reed, who died the previous month.

Approach
In this Gonzo-style interview, Lester Bangs attempts to demythologize rock-n-roll and its stars by giving the arrogant behavior of rock superstars a more vulnerable, human context.

Content
An extended introduction describes Bangs' complex feelings about the music of Lou Reed, admiring his songwriting genius, but intrigued by some of the anti-social aspects of Lou's more challenging albums, as well as Lou's sometimes hostile personality.  

After fortifying himself with research and drugs, Lester Bangs meets Lou Reed in a hotel room, where they trade barbed personal insults, and argue about the current music scene, amphetamine formulae, and the background music which Lou has selected (Herbie Hancock).

In a provocative gesture, Lester finally challenges Lou to remove his sunglasses:

"...Lou's sallow skin almost as whitish yellow as his hair, whole face and frame so transcendently emaciated he had indeed become insectival. His eyes were rusty, two copper coins lying in desert sands under the sun all day with telephone wires humming overhead, but he looked straight at me. Maybe through me..."

Quote
 "A hero is a goddam stupid thing to have in the first place and a general block to anything you might wanta accomplish on your own."

References

See also
Lester Bangs
Gonzo journalism
Lou Reed

Music journalism
Lou Reed
Interviews